Freixo de Numão is a civil parish in the municipality of Vila Nova de Foz Côa, Portugal. The population in 2011 was 609, in an area of 36.35 km2.

Climate
Freixo de Numão has a Mediterranean climate with even precipitation throughout the year, a rare tendency in the climate of Portugal, though not even enough to be classified as oceanic or humid subtropical.

References

Freguesias of Vila Nova de Foz Côa